

Films

LGBT
1971 in LGBT history
1971
1971